Irrumatio, (also known as irrumation, or by the colloquialism of face-fucking) is a form of oral sex in which someone thrusts their penis into another person's mouth, in contrast to fellatio where the penis is being actively orally excited by a fellator. The difference lies mainly in which party takes the active part. By extension, irrumation can also refer to the sexual technique of thrusting the penis between the thighs of a partner (intercrural sex).

In the ancient Roman sexual vocabulary, irrumatio is strictly a form of oral rape (os impurum), in which a man forces his penis into someone else's mouth, inducing vomiting for sexual gratification.

The act of irrumatio with forced vomiting is present in some online pornography, partly because of its shock effect and as a form of humiliation and degradation.

Etymology and history 
The English nouns irrumatio and irrumation, and the verb irrumate, come from the Latin , meaning to force receptive male oral sex.  J. L. Butrica, in his review of R. W. Hooper's edition of The Priapus Poems, a corpus of poems known as Priapeia in Latin, states that "some Roman sexual practices, like irrumatio, lack simple English equivalents".

There is some conjecture among linguists, as yet unresolved, that irrŭmātio may be connected with the Latin word rūmen, rūminis, the throat and gullet, whence 'ruminate', to chew the cud, therefore meaning 'insertion into the throat'. Others connect it with rūma or rūmis, an obsolete word for a teat, hence it would mean "giving milk", "giving to suck". (Compare the word fellō, which literally meant "suck (milk)" before it acquired its sexual sense.)

As the quotation from Butrica suggests and an article by W. A. Krenkel shows, irrumatio was a distinct sexual practice in ancient Rome. J. N. Adams states that "it was a standard joke to speak of irrumatio as a means of silencing someone". Oral sex was considered to be an act of defilement: the mouth had a particularly defined role as the organ of oratory, as in Greece, to participate in the central public sphere, where discursive powers were of great importance. Thus, to penetrate the mouth could be taken to be a sign of massive power differential within a relationship. Erotic art from Pompeii depicts irrumatio along with fututio, fellatio and cunnilingus, and pedicatio or anal sex. The extant wall paintings depicting explicit sex often appear to be in bathhouses and brothels, and oral sex was something usually practiced with prostitutes because of their lowly status.
Craig A. Williams argues that irrumatio was regarded as a degrading act, even more so than anal rape. S. Tarkovsky states that, despite being popular, it was thought to be a hostile act, "taken directly from the Greek, whereby the Greek men would have to force the fellatio by violence". Furthermore, as A. Richlin has shown in an article in the Journal of the History of Sexuality, it was also accepted as "oral rape", a punitive act against homosexuality. Catullus threatens two friends who have insulted him with both irrumatio and pedicatio in his Carmen 16, although the use could also mean "go to hell," rather than being a literal threat.

In modern English, the term "fellatio" has expanded to incorporate irrumatio, and the latter has fallen out of widespread use. Likewise, irrumatio might today be called "forced fellatio" or "oral rape". Often times in modern English, especially in a non-rape context, the term "face fucking" is used.

Another synonym for irrumatio is Egyptian rape or simply Egyptian; this goes back to the time of the Crusades when Mamluks were alleged to force their Christian captives to do this.

Ethnology 
"Peruvian erotic pottery of the Mochica cultures represent a form of fellatio in the vases showing oragenital acts. See the vases illustrated in color in Dr. Rafael Larco-Hoyle’s Checan (Love!), published in both French and English versions by Éditions Nagel in Geneva, 1965, plates 30–33 and 133–135. The action should really be considered irrumation".

See also 

 Deep-throating
 Latin obscenity
 Mammary intercourse
 Pearl necklace

Notes

Bibliography
 Legman, G. Oragenitalism : Oral Techniques in Genital Excitation. New York, Julian Press, 1969.

Fellatio
Oral eroticism
Penis
Sexual acts
Sexuality in ancient Rome